Warren E. Steller (October 8, 1897 – August 6, 1974) was an American football, basketball, and baseball player and coach.  He served as the head football coach at Bowling Green State Normal School—now known as Bowling Green State University—from 1924 to 1934, compiling a record of 40–21–19.  Steller was also the head basketball coach at Wesleyan University in 1922–23 and at Bowling Green in 1924–25, tallying a career college basketball mark of 18–12.  In addition, he was the head baseball coach at Wesleyan in 1923 and at Bowling Green in 1925 and again from 1928 to 1959, amassing a career college baseball record of 228–164.  Steller attended Oberlin College, where he played football, basketball, and baseball, and is considered one of the finest athletes ever to play for the Yeoman.  In 1921, the Oberlin football team beat Ohio State, 7–6, the last time an intrastate opponent beat Ohio State.  Steller scored the winning touchdown.  In 1965, Bowling Green renamed its baseball stadium Warren E. Steller Field in dedication to the former coach.

Playing career
In 1921, Oberlin's football team beat Ohio State, 7–6, at Columbus.  The Ohio State team had gone to the Rose Bowl the previous season.  That was the last time an intrastate team beat Ohio State.  Steller scored the winning touchdown after the team made an 85-yard march down the field in the third quarter, culminating in a short pass across the goal line and a point-after.  Ohio State's coach, John Wilce, was so upset by the loss that he made his squad stay on the field after the game for a special practice session.

Coaching career
Steller's 1944 baseball team at Bowling Green was Ohio college champions.

Head coaching record

Football

References

External links
 

1897 births
1974 deaths
American men's basketball players
Bowling Green Falcons athletic directors
Bowling Green Falcons baseball coaches
Bowling Green Falcons football coaches
Bowling Green Falcons men's basketball coaches
Oberlin Yeomen baseball players
Oberlin Yeomen basketball players
Oberlin Yeomen football players
Wesleyan Cardinals baseball coaches
Wesleyan Cardinals men's basketball coaches